Charles Henry Charlot de Courcy (22 August 1834<ref>[http://canadp-archivesenligne.paris.fr/archives_etat_civil/avant_1860_fichiers_etat_civil_reconstitue/fecr_visu_img.php?registre=V3E_N_0446&type=ECRF&&bdd_en_cours=etat_civil_rec_fichiers&vue_tranche_debut=AD075ER_5MI20773_03210_C&vue_tranche_fin=AD075ER_5MI20773_03260_C&ref_histo=68441&cote=V3E/N%20446 Fichier des naissances de la Ville de Paris, fiche n° 18/51.]  Archives en ligne de la Ville de Paris, état-civil reconstitué.</ref> – 12 December 1917) was a 19th-century French dramatist and journalist.

He was the son of dramatist, poet and chansonnier Frédéric de Courcy (1796–1862).

A journalist at L'Illustration, his plays were presented, among others, at the Théâtre du Gymnase, the Théâtre de l'Odéon, the Théâtre du Vaudeville and the Comédie-française.

 Works 
1853: Un Merlan en bonne fortune, comédie en vaudevilles in 1 act, with Charles Labie and Varin
1853: La Pompadour des Porcherons, comédie en vaudevilles in 1 act, with Labie
1858: Entre Hommes, pochade in 1 acte, mingled with couplets
1860: Daniel Lambert, drama in 5 acts, en prose
1861: Les Histoires du café de Paris, Michel Lévy
1861: Le Chemin le plus long, comedy in 3 acts, in prose
1862: Diane de Valneuil, comedy in 5 acts, in prose
1865: La Marieuse, comedy in 2 acts, with Lambert-Thiboust
1872: Les Vieilles Filles, comedy in 5 acts, in prose, with Victorien Sardou
1876: Andrette, comedy in 1 act, in prose
1876: Mademoiselle Didier, 4-act play, in prose, with Eugène Nus
1881: Madame de Navaret, 3-act play, with Eugène Nus
1882: Un mari malgré lui, 1-act comedy, with E. Nus
1883: Toujours !, 1 act comedy
1890: Une Conversion, 1-act comedy, in prose

 Bibliography 
 Pierre Larousse, Grand dictionnaire universel du XIXe siècle, 1866,  (p. 281)
 Gustave Vapereau, Dictionnaire universel des contemporains, 1870,  (p. 497)
 Edmond de Goncourt, Jules de Goncourt, Journal; Mémoires de la Vie Littéraire: 1891-1896'', 1956,  (p. 1077)

References

External links 
 Charles de Courcy on data.bnf.fr

19th-century French journalists
19th-century French dramatists and playwrights
1834 births
Writers from Paris
1917 deaths
French male dramatists and playwrights
French male journalists
19th-century French male writers